Hordes of the Brave is the second studio album by Belgian band Iron Mask, released on April 22, 2005 by Lion Music. All songs were composed by Dushan Petrossi.

Track listing
 "Holy War" – 5:12
 "Freedom's Blood - The Patriot" – 4:31
 "Time" – 5:08
 "The Invisible Empire" – 5:34
 "Demon's Child" – 5:38
 "High in the Sky" – 4:46
 "Alexander the Great — Hordes of the Brave (Pt. 1)" – 6:45
 "Crystal Tears" – 4:04
 "Iced Wind of the North" – 6:29
 "My Eternal Flame" – 5:08
 "Troops of Avalon" – 6:09

Personnel
Dushan Petrossi - all electric and acoustic guitars
Goetz "Valhalla jr" Mohr - lead and back vocals
Oliver Hartmann - lead vocals on 4, 8, 9, back vocals
Richard Andersson - all lead keyboards
Vassili Moltchanov - bass
Anton Arkhipov - drums, background keyboards

Production
Dushan Petrossi - producer
Didier Chesneau - mixing
JC Lemaitre - mixing
Yvan Galasse - sound engineer
Oliver Hartmann - vocal recording
Leo Hao - front cover design
Eric Phillippe - booklet design, logo

References

Iron Mask (band) albums
2005 albums